Outrospective is the third album by Faithless, released on 18 June 2001. It is the follow-up to Sunday 8PM and the predecessor to No Roots. The single "We Come 1" had the most success, charting at number 3 on the UK Singles Chart, while "One Step Too Far" with vocals from Dido charted at number 6, and both "Muhammad Ali" and "Tarantula" charted at number 29. The album itself reached number 6 on the UK Albums Chart.
The cover photograph was taken during the May 1968 students uprisings in Paris, France.
In the cover booklet of Forever Faithless – The Greatest Hits, Rollo Armstrong has stated that despite Outrospective being their biggest selling album in the UK, it is, however, his least favourite.

Track listing

Outrospective / Reperspective

Outrospective / Reperspective is a re-release of the Outrospective album from Faithless. The CD contains a bonus CD with remixes. The album won the Dancestar Award for Album of the Year in 2002.

Charts

Weekly charts

Year-end charts

Certifications and sales

!scope="row"|Worldwide
|
|700,000
|-

References

Faithless albums
Cheeky Records albums
2001 albums
Albums produced by Rollo Armstrong